Nathan Magee is a professional rugby league footballer who plays as a  forward for the Castleford Tigers in the Betfred Super League.

In 2021 he made his Super League début for Castleford against the Salford Red Devils.

References

External links
Castleford Tigers profile
Castleford Tigers: Who are Cain Robb, Caelum Jordan, Jack Sadler, Adam Rusling and Nathan Magee? Introducing FIVE teenagers making their debut against Salford Red Devils

2003 births
Living people
Castleford Tigers players
English rugby league players
Rugby league second-rows